Junodia spinosa is a species of praying mantis found in the Congo River region.

See also
List of mantis genera and species

References

spinosa
Mantodea of Africa
Fauna of East Africa
Insects of the Democratic Republic of the Congo
Insects of the Republic of the Congo
Insects described in 1972